"Nobody" is a song by South Korean girl group Wonder Girls, taken from their first extended play The Wonder Years: Trilogy (2008). It was written and produced by Park Jin-young, with additional songwriting by Rhee Woo-seok. Musically, "Nobody" is retro-inspired dance-pop song that lyrically conveys the affections the members' have towards their lovers. The song was released in South Korea on September 22, 2008 by JYP Entertainment, and was re-released in English on June 26, 2009, where it was included in their next EP 2 Different Tears (2010). 

"Nobody" was a commercial success; it was a top search term in South Korea upon its release and ranked number one on various digital music sites. In the United States, the English version of the track set a milestone in K-pop—it was the first song by a Korean artist to appear on the US Billboard Hot 100, entering at number 76 on the chart issue dated October 31, 2009. Chinese and Japanese versions of the song were also recorded and was made available as part of the group's later records.

Three music videos for "Nobody" were filmed: versions in Korean, English, and Japanese. In South Korea, promotions for the single featured the group performing it on various music programs throughout late 2008. Their performance on M Countdown posted by Mnet that November subsequently became the most viewed K-pop video on the platform, and became the first to surpass 50 million views in 2011. In the US, the group performed it as part of the opening act for Jonas Brothers World Tour 2009.

Background and release
The song first appeared on their first mini-album The Wonder Years: Trilogy (2008), including a remix and instrumental versions. The group's official Myspace stated that an English version of "Nobody" would be released in the United States sometime in 2009, serving as their debut single there, with JYP Entertainment confirming the release in early June 2009. "Nobody" was released to iTunes on June 26, 2009, and to Amazon MP3 a day later. Wonder Girls set up an official YouTube account which includes the English version of music video. A physical single was released in a cross-promotion with Justice stores on October 11, 2009. The Wonder Girls promoted the release with two meet-and-greet events at Justice stores. Various remixes of "Nobody" were produced for various award shows and end-of-year specials. The official American remix of the song was included on the remix physical single, done by American DJ Jason Nevins. A downtempo, re-recorded remix produced by Rainstone was released in both Korean and English.

In 2010, Wonder Girls entered the Chinese market with the Chinese/Taiwan Special Edition, a greatest hits album containing thirteen of the group's biggest songs since debut. In addition to their hit songs, Chinese versions of "Tell Me", "Nobody", and "So Hot" were on the album. The compilation included DVD with three music videos: "Tell Me", "Nobody" and "So Hot". In May 2012, Wonder Girls announced their official debut into the Japanese market with DefStar Records with a Japanese version of Nobody, "Nobody ～あなたしか見えない～", in a Japanese debut EP/DVD titled Nobody for Everybody, released on July 25, 2012. EP contained Japanese versions of their songs, while DVD included their music videos and live performances.

Commercial performance 
On the Billboard Hot 100 chart issue dated October 31, 2009, the single debuted at number 76, making it the first K-pop song to enter the chart. An editor from PopCrush attributed the chart entry in part to the group opening for The Jonas Brothers' summer U.S. tour "when the Disney boy band was at the height of [their] popularity." On November 20, it was reported that the single had sold 32,000 physical copies and over 30,000 digital downloads according to Nielsen Soundscan. It became the best-selling physical single of the year in the United States, topping the year-end Billboard Hot Single Sales chart for 2009, which measured commercial singles sales over the year across the North American region. By February 2012, the single had sold 78,000 downloads and 42,000 physical copies in the US. At the 2011 China Mobile Wireless Music Awards, Wonder Girls were awarded the "Top Gross Selling Digital Downloads" award in the foreign group category for 5,371,903 downloads sold of the singles "Nobody", "Tell Me"  and "2 Different Tears".

Music video

Korean and English
The music video begins with Park Jin-young performing a Motown-style concert with the Wonder Girls as his backup singers. After the show, a couple of record executives give Park sheet lyrics to the song "Nobody", which he prepares to debut on his next show during the 1960s. Minutes before his show begins, Park is in the men's restroom using a toilet stall when he realizes that there is no toilet paper available. As he frantically calls for help, everyone on stage begins to wonder where he is as the show starts. The executives then motion the Wonder Girls to bring their microphone stands forward and take center stage. At the end of their performance, Park finally appears on stage to congratulate the group for their performance. While the song plays, the video becomes a montage of the group's career progressing to superstardom. At the end of the video, Park enters another toilet stall and sees that there is toilet paper available. Unfortunately for him, he pulls the last sheet off the dispenser and once again has to call for help.

Japanese
The PV begins with Sohee holding a newspaper The New York Lines with the "wonderful" Wonder Girls as the front cover and an article titled "Nobody, the worldwide hit". Sohee in white shades folds the newspaper. Then, it reveals that the Wonder Girls are in an airplane. The screen pans from left to right, showing the members in neon dresses: Sunye in green, Hyelim in blue, Yoobin in orange, Yeeun in yellow, and Sohee in pink. As the airplane side slides down, the member walk out from the stairs to be greeted by paparazzi. The girls walk past the paparazzi forward to a stage. The back of the stage slides closed. Yoobin begins with "it'll never change" and the song begins with the girls dancing with their microphone stands. After Sohee's second verse and during Yeeun's chorus, it pans out to show a black-and-white TV showing the Nobody music video. A family is watching and dancing to Nobody in one room and switches to another room with two ladies dancing along. The TV is zoomed in to see the girls in changed dresses and hairstyles. The girls are in upgraded golden dresses similar to the ones in their 2008 version. The stage changed to have a live band, a pianist to the left, and four background singers to the right. The song continues with Yeeun and Sunye sharing the chorus leading to Yeeun's high note, then Sunye's ad libs. The song ends with Yoobin's rap and a pose with the microphones.

Live performances and promotion 
The Wonder Girls had their official comeback on the weekend of September 26–28, 2008, performing on KBS's Music Bank, MBC's Show! Music Core, and SBS's Inkigayo. At the end of October, the group briefly used the "Rainstone Remix" of the song. A video of their M Countdown performance from October 9, 2008 was posted to Mnet's official YouTube channel on November 18, and soon became the most viewed K-pop video on the platform. In 2011, it became the first K-pop video to surpass 50 million views. At the 2008 Mnet KM Music Festival on November 15, 2008, Wonder Girls performed a tango version and a disco version of "Nobody". The rest of the remixes debuted at the 23rd Golden Disc Awards on December 10, which showcased each Wonder Girl performing a short clip of a unique "Nobody" remix. 

For their American live television debut, they performed "Nobody" on The Wendy Williams Show on July 20, 2009. They also performed it on So You Think You Can Dance on December 9. Their first live performance of the Japanese version of Nobody was at the Girls Award 2012 Spring/Summer by Crooz fashion event in Tokyo. Wonder Girls were the only Korean group to be invited at the event as one of the performing artists, aside from opening act, Code-V. On August 8, 2015, they reprised this song with instrumental version in conjunction with their 2015 comeback as a 4 members band group at You Hee-yeol's Sketchbook.

Other usage 
In 2013, the song was featured in the sixth episode of the South Korean television drama series Master's Sun. In 2014, "Nobody" was used in the DreamWorks animated movie Penguins of Madagascar. Hyerim said, "It's an honor for us to represent Asian artists and have our song selected for the great animated film." Yubin added that "We hope this will help shed light on more works by Asian artists".

In March 2009, it was reported that both JYP Entertainment and Sony/ATV Music Publishing would be taking legal action against other Asian musical groups who had adopted or covered "Nobody" illegally. JYP Entertainment stated that groups and actresses in the People's Republic of China and Cambodia had been "recklessly copying" the group's songs, dances, and costumes.

Legacy
In 2017, Billboard ranked it as the 43rd greatest girl group song of all-time, deeming it as a breakthrough moment in K-pop history where it marked one of the first indicators that Korean acts had appeal in America. Tamar Herman of the same publication wrote that "It revived the industry with a modern update to old school sounds that drew on Motown and the disco era for inspiration, which resulted in the single becoming one of the most popular Korean songs ever." PopCrush said that what perhaps made entering Billboard "especially momentous was the fact that they remained true to their signature style, and didn't change it to appeal to accommodate American audiences." In a ranking by 35 music experts curated by Melon and Seoul Shinmun in 2021, "Nobody" was ranked the 27th best K-pop song of all time. Music critic Han Dong-yoon said that the song's simple choreography and structure propelled it to becoming a hit. However, he pointed out that although it was not a huge commercial success in America, it holds important value in K-pop history as it became an example of how Korean singers could enter foreign markets.

Awards

Track listing
Digital single – US
 "Nobody" — 3:34

Nobody (Sing-Along Version) – US
 "Nobody (English version)" — 3:34
 "Nobody (Karaoke Version)" — 3:34
 "Nobody (Instrumental Remastered)" — 3:36

Nobody (The Remix Edition) – US
 "Nobody" (Jason Nevins Remix) — 3:32
 "Nobody" (Jason Nevins Extended Remix) — 5:50
 "Nobody" (Jason Nevins Remix) [Instrumental] — 3:32
 "Nobody" (Jason Nevins Extended Remix) [Instrumental] — 5:50

Charts

Weekly charts

Year-end charts

Release history

See also
 List of best-selling singles in South Korea

References

Wonder Girls songs
2008 singles
2009 singles
Dance-pop songs
JYP Entertainment singles
Korean-language songs
2008 songs
Songs written by Park Jin-young
South Korean synth-pop songs
South Korean contemporary R&B songs
English-language South Korean songs